The Soviet Cup, or USSR Cup, was the premier football cup competition in the Soviet Union conducted by the Football Federation of the Soviet Union. As a knockout tournament it was conducted parallel to the All-Union league competitions in double round-robin format.

The winner of the competition was awarded a qualification to the UEFA Cup Winners' Cup, unless it already qualified for the European Cup, in turn passed the qualification to the finalist. In case if a team would win the UEFA Cup Winners' Cup and not win its national league cup titles next year, it qualified to the UEFA Cup Winners' Cup along with the new cup holder. The first participation in the UEFA Cup Winners' Cup took place in 1965–66 when Dynamo Kyiv qualified for the European competition for winning the 1964 Soviet Cup.

Format
Format of competitions was constantly changing. Until 1984 the Soviet Cup corresponded to the Soviet Top League calendar "spring"-"fall", however after that it changed to "fall"-"spring" calendar which is now the most popular in Europe. In 1959-1960 the competition was conducted for two years. From 1965 to 1968 seasons were overlapping each other. The 1992 Soviet Cup Final took place after the fall of the Soviet Union in the independent Russia.

All tournaments final were played in a single game in Moscow, but until introduction of penalty kicks as a tie-breaker some finals that ended in tie were replayed. Until 1955 the tournament finals were played at Central Stadium "Dynamo", after being transferred to Central Stadium of Lenin (today Luzhniki Stadium).

Finals

Overall statistics

Performance by club

Performance by republic

Best coaches

Another coach Albert Vollrat won two cups in 1946 and 1947.

Notes

References

External links

USSR (Soviet Union) – List of Cup Finals, rsssf.com. Retrieved 16 May 2006.

 
Cup
Soviet Union
Recurring sporting events established in 1936
Recurring events disestablished in 1992
1936 establishments in the Soviet Union
1992 disestablishments in Europe